The 1957 Cork Intermediate Hurling Championship was the 48th staging of the Cork Intermediate Hurling Championship since its establishment by the Cork County Board in 1909.

Glen Rovers won the championship following a 6-08 to 2-06 defeat of St. Finbarr's in the final. This was their fourth championship title overall and their second title in succession.

References

Cork Intermediate Hurling Championship
Cork Intermediate Hurling Championship